The Des Moines metropolitan area, officially known as the Des Moines–West Des Moines, IA Metropolitan Statistical Area (MSA) is located at the confluence of the Des Moines River and the Raccoon River. Des Moines serves as the capital of the U.S. state of Iowa The metro area consists of six counties in central Iowa: Polk, Dallas, Warren, Madison, Guthrie, and Jasper. The Des Moines–Ames–West Des Moines Combined Statistical Area (CSA) encompasses the separate metropolitan area of Ames (Story County), and the separate micropolitan areas of Pella (Marion County), Boone (Boone County) and Oskaloosa (Mahaska County). The Des Moines area is a fast-growing metro area.

Des Moines–West Des Moines, IA Metropolitan Statistical Area

Des Moines-Ames-West Des Moines, IA Combined Statistical Area

Geography

The lowest geographical point in the metropolitan area is the Des Moines River, where it passes the northeastern corner of Warren County, and the southeastern corner of Polk County.

Historical definitions
Polk County was originally the only county in the Des Moines metropolitan area when the United States Bureau of the Budget (now the United States Office of Management and Budget) began defining metropolitan areas in 1950. Warren County was added in 1973 and Dallas County was added in 1983. Guthrie and Madison counties were added in 2003 after metropolitan areas were redefined. In 2005 the area was renamed the Des Moines–West Des Moines Metropolitan Statistical Area after a special census showed that West Des Moines had topped the 50,000 mark in population. Jasper county was added in September 2018.

Communities by size

Population as of 2020 Census

Principal City
 Des Moines (214,133)

Places with 50,000 to 100,000 inhabitants
 West Des Moines (68,723)
 Ankeny (67,887)

Places with 10,000 to 50,000 inhabitants

 Urbandale (45,580)
 Johnston (24,064)
 Waukee (23,940)
 Altoona (19,565)
 Clive (18,601)
 Indianola (15,833)
 Newton (15,760)
 Grimes (15,392)
 Norwalk (12,799)
 Pleasant Hill (10,147)

Places with 1,000 to 10,000 inhabitants

 Perry (7,836)
 Bondurant (7,365)
 Adel (6,153)
 Winterset (5,353)
 Windsor Heights (5,252)
 Carlisle (4,160)
 Saylorville (census-designated place) (3,301)
 Mitchellville (2,485)
 Polk City (2,344)
 Colfax (2,255)
 Monroe (1,967)
 Dallas Center (1,901)
 Stuart (partial) (1,782)
 Prairie City (1,700)
 Granger (1,654)
 Guthrie Center (1,593)
 Van Meter (1,484)
 Earlham (1,410)
 Woodward (1,346)
 Coon Rapids (partial) (1,300)
 Panora (1,091)

Places with fewer than 1,000 inhabitants

 Baxter (962)
 De Soto (915)
 Elkhart (882)
 Sully (881)
 Adair (partial) (791)
 Milo (778)
 Hartford (733)
 Redfield (731)
 Dexter (640)
 St. Charles (640)
 Kellogg (606)
 Truro (509)
 New Virginia (498)
 Runnells (457)
 Cumming (436)
 Alleman (423)
 Martensdale (421)
 Bayard (405)
 Casey (partial) (387)
 Lynnville (380)
 Lacona (345)
 Menlo (345)
 Minburn (325)
 Mingo (302)
 Sheldahl (partial) (297)
 Yale (267)
 Bagley (233)
 Linden (200)
 Jamaica (195)
 Oakland Acres (176)
 Patterson (176)
 Lambs Grove (174)
 Reasnor (152)
 Bouton (127)
 Dawson (116)
 Ackworth (115)
 East Peru (115)
 St. Marys (108)
 Macksburg (97)
 Spring Hill (68)
 Sandyville (58)
 Bevington (57)
 Valeria (39)

Unincorporated places

 Avon
 Berwick
 Booneville
 Farrar
 Ira
 Killduff
 Rushville
 Liberty Center

Demographics of metropolitan area

As of the census of 2000, there were 481,394 people, 189,371 households, and 126,177 families residing within the MSA. The racial makeup of the MSA was 90.24% White, 3.85% African American, 0.24% Native American, 2.15% Asian, 0.05% Pacific Islander, 2.00% from other races, and 1.46% from two or more races. Hispanic or Latino of any race were 4.02% of the population.

The median income for a household in the MSA was $44,667, and the median income for a family was $52,617. Males had a median income of $34,710 versus $25,593 for females. The per capita income for the MSA was $21,253. 

The census tracts for 2000 are shown in the map from the Iowa Data Center.

Economy

Des Moines is a major center of the US insurance industry and has a sizable financial services and publishing business base. The city was credited as the "number one spot for U.S. insurance companies" in a Business Wire article and named the third-largest "insurance capital" of the world. The city is the headquarters for the Principal Financial Group, Ruan Transportation, TMC Transportation, EMC Insurance Companies, and Wellmark Blue Cross Blue Shield. Other major corporations such as Wells Fargo, Cognizant, Voya Financial, Nationwide Mutual Insurance Company, ACE Limited, Marsh, Monsanto, and Corteva have large operations in or near the metropolitan area. In recent years, Microsoft, Hewlett-Packard, and Facebook have built data-processing and logistical facilities in the Des Moines area.

The Des Moines area is home to 5 Fortune 1000 headquarters – 2021 rankings

Education

Colleges and universities

 Des Moines Area Community College - Des Moines, Ankeny, Boone, Carroll, Newton and West Des Moines
 Drake University - Des Moines
 Faith Baptist Bible College - Ankeny
 Grand View University - Des Moines
 Mercy College of Health Sciences - Des Moines
 Simpson College - Indianola and West Des Moines
 Purdue University Global - Urbandale
 Upper Iowa University - West Des Moines

Sports

Transportation

Airports 

 Des Moines International Airport (DSM)

Relief Airports

 Ankeny Regional Airport (IKV)
 Ames Municipal Airport (AMW)
 Boone Municipal Airport (BNW)
 Grinnell Regional Airport (GGI)
 Guthrie County Regional Airport (GCT)
 Newton Municipal Airport (TNU)
 Oskaloosa Municipal Airport (OOA)
 Winterset Municipal Airport (343)

Major Highways 

Interstates                                                                                                               
  I-35                                                
  I-80                                                                                                                                                          
  I-235     

                                                                                                                                                                   
                                                                                                                                                                      
U S Highways                                                                                                                                                          
  US 6                                                                                                                                                                     
  US 65 
  US 69    

                                                                                       

Iowa Highways
  IA 5 
  IA 28     
  IA 141      
  IA 163 
  IA 415

References

 
Regions of Iowa
Geography of Des Moines, Iowa